Filipp Olegovich Kondryukov (born 24 February 1997) is a Russian football player.

Club career
He played his first game for the main squad of FC Rostov on 24 September 2015 in a Russian Cup game against FC Tosno.

References

External links
 
 

1997 births
Sportspeople from Rostov-on-Don
Living people
Russian footballers
FC Rostov players
Association football midfielders
FC Dynamo Stavropol players
FC SKA Rostov-on-Don players